The Pasłęka is a river in northern Poland that debouches into the Baltic Sea on the Vistula Lagoon near Braniewo. It flows through the Olsztyn and Mrągowo lakelands, and through Gdańsk Coastal Area.

The river springs nearby Olsztynek, between Stawiguda and Gryźliny, at  AMSL; though some sources place it in the Pasłęk reservoir, which lies at  AMSL.

The river flows through the town of Braniewo.

Pasłęka's average mouth discharge equals .

The whole length of the river is covered by River Pasłęka Beaver Refugium nature reserve.

Pasłęka is one of Warmia's two main rivers, accompanied by Łyna.

Pasłęka divides two historical lands: Warmia and Upper Prussia (Powiśle), consequently for centuries bordering Polish Warmia and the Polish fiefdoms of the Teutonic Order and Ducal Prussia.

In the 2007 water quality survey conducted on Pasłęka 2 kilometers (1.2 mi) from its mouth, its water was classified as the 4th class.The historic Polish name Pasłęka was officially confirmed following World War II in 1949, replacing the former German name Passarge''.

Infrastructure 
Pasłęka is sailable between its mouth in Nowa Pasłęka and the hydro plant in Braniewo.
Several hydro plants are built on the river:
 Braniewo - power: 0,815 MVA
 Pierzchały - power: 3,3 MVA, built in 1936
 Stygajny - planned at the site of the unfinished German weir 
 'Kormoran' in Łęgucki Młyn
 Kasztanowo. installed power of 0,1 MW, rebuilt after a complete destruction and reopened in 1989.

Tributaries 
 Rivers: Stara Pasłęka, Wałsza p., Giłwa, Jemiołówka, Marąg, Miłakówka.
 Streams: Bardynka, Biebrza, Drwęca Warmińska p., Lipówka, Łaźnica p., Młynówka, Młyńska Struga
 Canals: Kanał Rusy, Kanał Skolity, Kanał Energetyczny

Pasłęka crosses the following lakes: Wymój, Sarąg, Łęguty, Isąg.

See also
Rivers of Poland

References

Rivers of Poland
 
Rivers of Warmian-Masurian Voivodeship
Natura 2000 in Poland